The 1891 Dartmouth football team represented Dartmouth College as a member of the Eastern Intercollegiate Football Association (EIFA) during the 1891 college football season. Dartmouth compiled an overall record of 2–2–1 with a mark of 2–1–1 in EIFA play.

Schedule

References

Dartmouth
Dartmouth Big Green football seasons
Dartmouth football